The Iraq Central FA Perseverance Cup, previously called Iraq Central FA Altruism Cup (Arabic:  كأس الإيثار, Al-Ithar Cup), was an annual Iraqi football match contested at the end of the season between the champions and the runners-up of the Iraq Central FA League, the top-level division of football in Baghdad and its neighbouring cities between 1948 and 1973. The lower divisions in the region each also had their own Perseverance Cup match.

Only five editions of the tournament were played before it was stopped, and the Iraq Football Association later decided to replace regional tournaments with national tournaments, with the Iraqi Perseverance Cup (now known as Iraqi Super Cup) becoming the nation's super cup tournament.

Statistics

Matches

Most successful clubs

List of winning managers

References

External links
 Iraqi Football Website
 Rsssf.com Iraq - List of Cup Winners

Football competitions in Iraq